Andrew Dunlop, (born 11 December 1957), is a Scottish former professional footballer who played as a defender for St Mirren, Partick Thistle and Morton in the Scottish Football League Premier Division. He also made one appearance in the UEFA Cup for St Mirren against AS Saint-Étienne in 1980, the French side containing the likes of Patrick Battiston, Michel Platini and Johnny Rep.

After leaving Morton, Dunlop played Junior football in his native Ayrshire, firstly with Annbank United, before beginning a 23-year association with Glenafton Athletic as a player, assistant manager and coach. He was also co-manager with former Partick teammate Alan Rough during the Glens successful period in the 1990s. Dunlop was awarded a testimonial match against Kilmarnock in 2007 for his service and finally left the New Cumnock club in 2009.

References

External links

Living people
1957 births
Scottish footballers
St Mirren F.C. players
Partick Thistle F.C. players
Annbank United F.C. players
Glenafton Athletic F.C. players
Association football defenders
Scottish Football League players
Scottish Junior Football Association players
Scottish football managers